Fred Stillkrauth (1939 – 7 August 2020) was a German actor, perhaps best known for his work in Sam Peckinpah's Cross of Iron.

Fred Stillkrauth was born in 1939 in Munich, Germany, and died on 7 August 2020.

Filmography
Stillkrauth played roles, mostly supporting roles, in films and television series, including:

References

External links
 
 

1939 births
Male actors from Munich
German male film actors
German male television actors
20th-century German male actors
2020 deaths